The Apple Cinema Display is a line of flat-panel computer monitors developed and sold by Apple Inc. between 1999 and 2011. It was initially sold alongside the older line of Studio Displays, but eventually replaced them. Apple offered 20, 22, 23, 24, 27, and 30-inch sizes, with the last model being a 27-inch size with LED backlighting.

There have been three designs for the Cinema Display, one featuring polycarbonate plastic and two featuring anodized aluminum. The first displays were designed to match the colorful plastic of the Power Mac G3 and later the Power Mac G4, while the second revisions were designed to match the aluminum aesthetics of the Power Mac G5 and PowerBook G4. The last available design matched the unibody laptops released in October 2008. 

The Apple Cinema Display name was retired in July 2011 with the introduction of the Apple Thunderbolt Display, and the Cinema Display models were no longer offered on the Apple Store website as of August 2014.

Models

Cinema Display 
The first model—the 22-inch Apple Cinema Display—was introduced in September 1999 alongside the Power Mac G4 and used DVI for video input. It was enclosed in a high-density plastic frame with an easel-style stand and had a display resolution of 1600×1024. 

This model was upgraded in July 2000 with the Apple Display Connector (ADC), which ran DVI, USB, and 28V power through a single connector. 

It was eventually replaced by a 20-inch model on January 28, 2003, that sported a widescreen display with up to 1680×1050 resolution and a brightness of 230 cd/m2.

The 20" Cinema Display was updated again June 28, 2004 to match the aluminum design of the new Cinema HD Display.  It retained the 1680x1050 resolution of the previous model but saw its brightness increased to 250 cd/m2, and was introduced at a $1,299 USD price point.  Apple continued to sell this display with no further changes until October 2008.

Cinema HD Display 
The 23-inch model, dubbed the "Cinema HD Display," was introduced on March 20, 2002, and supported full 1:1 1080p playback on a 1920x1200 pixel display.

On June 28, 2004, Apple introduced a redesigned line of Cinema Displays, along with a new 30-inch model that, like the 23-inch model, carried the "Cinema HD Display" name. The new models had an anodized aluminum enclosure that matched Apple's high-end lines of professional products. An alternative stand or a wall mount could be used with a VESA mount adapter kit that was sold separately. Though the display enclosures had not been redesigned for a long period of time, several "silent" improvements were made to the brightness levels and contrast ratios.<ref>{{cite web | last = Taghap | first = Herschell | date = March 28, 2006 | url = https://arstechnica.com/gadgets/2006/03/3369/ | title = Apple's 30 Cinema Display gets quiet upgrade | publisher = Ars Technica | access-date =August 3, 2010}}</ref>

 30-inch model compatibility 
Due to the high resolution (2560×1600), the 30-inch model requires a graphics card that supports dual-link DVI. When the monitor was released, no Macintosh models were sold with a dual-link DVI port. A Power Mac G5 with the new Nvidia GeForce 6800 Ultra DDL graphics card was initially required to run the display at full resolution.

All Power Mac G5, PowerBook G4, and Mac Pro mid 2006 to mid 2010 models are capable of supporting it without the use of any adapters. Discrete MacBook Pros are also capable of driving the 30-inch display, while all Macs released after October 2008 require an additional adapter. The 30-inch Cinema Display was introduced together with the GeForce 6800, which supports two DVI-DL ports. ATI's aftermarket AGP X800 Mac Edition also supports dual-link DVI, but has only one port. The Radeon 9600 Mac/PC was another aftermarket graphics card that supported dual-link DVI and was also compatible with older AGP-based Power Macs.

If a computer with a single-link DVI port (such as a Mac laptop with a mini-DVI connector) is connected to the 30-inch display, it will only run at 1280×800, even if the computer is capable of supporting 1920×1200 over a single-link connection.

 LED Cinema Display 
On October 14, 2008, the 20-inch Cinema Display and the 23-inch Cinema HD Display were replaced with a 24-inch model made with aluminum and glass, reflecting the appearances of the latest iMac, unibody MacBook Pro, and unibody MacBook designs. The display features a built-in iSight camera, microphone and dual speaker system. A MagSafe cable runs from the back of the display for charging notebooks. It is the first Cinema Display to use LED backlighting and Mini DisplayPort for video input; however, the LED backlighting is edge-lit as opposed to the fully back-lit CCFL of the previous models, resulting in a lower brightness cd/m2 output. This display is only officially compatible with Macs that have the Mini DisplayPort connector. A third-party converter must be used in order to use this display with older Macs. Furthermore, many newer Apple users with newer MacBooks that solely have USB-C ports have been continuously perplexed by the fact that their Apple-branded Thunderbolt 3 (USB-C) to Thunderbolt 2 adapters do not transmit a signal to their LED Cinema displays. Many users have mistakenly presumed their new MacBooks were incompatible with their older displays, when in fact an ordinary generic USB-C to Mini DisplayPort adapter will successfully transmit the same signal; This is due to a small internal difference in the newer Thunderbolt 2 and the older Mini DisplayPort standards.

With the introduction of LED panels, the matte, anti-glare screen panels were retired, except for the 30" Cinema Display. Apple had already moved away from matte screens in its line of iMac desktop computers on August 7, 2007. Apple had not offered any equipment with a matte, anti-glare screen after the 15" non-Retina MacBook Pro was discontinued in October 2013 until the introduction of the Pro Display XDR in 2019. This had been a cause for concern among users who wanted matte screens for their area of work, particularly graphic designers, photographers and users who extensively view their screens. Matte screens, like matte-surface photographs, diffuse reflected light and cannot provide the same black levels as glossy screens, which are required for working with HDR images and videos and thus are disadvantaged in this area. However, the matte screens have a far lower level of reflectivity, which improves ease-of-use.The Wall Street Journal'' referred to Apple's removal of the matte screen as one of Apple's worst design decisions.

On July 26, 2010, the 24-inch LED Cinema Display and the 30-inch Cinema HD Display were replaced by a 27-inch model that supports up to 2560×1440 resolution.  This model was sold for $999 USD.

On July 20, 2011, the LED Cinema Display was discontinued, and replaced by the Apple Thunderbolt Display.

Technical specifications 

 On August 7, 2006 the Aluminium Cinema displays had a silent upgrade that boosted the brightness and contrast ratios to 300/400 cd/m2 and 700:1. The last Cinema displays are still desirable to professionals being the last anti-glare displays made by Apple (until the Pro Display XDR) and having a true IPS 8-bit (no dithering) fully back-lit panel and slightly higher brightness than that of the newer Apple Thunderbolt displays, which have a reflective glossy screen and an edge-lit panel. These displays (including the LED Cinema 24”) are the last Apple desktop monitors made in 16:10 aspect ratio that is also used on MacBook Pros and provides more vertical work space.

References

External links 
 Apple Cinema Display 20/23/30-inch User's Guide at Apple
 Apple Cinema Display (1999) at Apple Matters
 Apple Cinema HD Display 23”
 Apple Cinema (20”) Display
 Apple Cinema Display (20” DVI, 23” DVI and 30"DVI)
 Apple Cinema Display Series at EveryMac

Articles 
 Kubicki, Kristopher. "The 20 inch LCD shootout: Dell versus Apple", "AnandTech", April 27, 2005.
 Luepke, Lara. "Battle of the 30-inch monitors: Apple Cinema Display vs. Dell UltraSharp 3007WFP", "CNET prizefight", March 22, 2006.

Apple Inc. monitors
Apple Inc. peripherals
Computer-related introductions in 1999